Grušce is a small dispersed settlement in the hills northwest of Dramlje in the Municipality of Šentjur, in eastern Slovenia. The settlement, and the municipality, are included in the Savinja Statistical Region, which is in the Slovenian portion of the historical Duchy of Styria.

Name
The name of the settlement was changed from Drušce to Grušce in 1952.

References

External links
Grušce at Geopedia

Populated places in the Municipality of Šentjur